Figure skating at the 2023 Winter World University Games was held on January 13–15 at the Herb Brooks Arena in Lake Placid, New York, United States. Medals were awarded in men's singles, women's singles and ice dance.

Regulations
Skaters who were born between 1 January 1997 and 31 December 2005 are eligible to compete at the Winter Universiade if they are registered as proceeding towards a degree or diploma at a university or similar institute, or obtained their academic degree or diploma in the year preceding the event.

In pairs and ice dance, only one partner must be a citizen of the country for which they are competing. Each nation may send a maximum of three entries per discipline.

Medal summary

Medal table

Medalists

Schedule
Listed in local time (UTC-05:00).

Entries

Changes to preliminary entries

Results

Men

Women

Ice dance

References

External links
Results book

2023 Winter World University Games
2023
Winter Universiade
2023 Winter Universiade